Kalki is a 1984 Indian Malayalam film, directed by N. Sankaran Nair. The film stars Adoor Bhasi and Ambika in the lead roles. The film has musical score by G. Devarajan.

Cast
Adoor Bhasi
Ambika
Mohammed Zaheer

Soundtrack
The music was composed by G. Devarajan and the lyrics were written by Kaniyapuram Ramachandran and Malayattoor Ramakrishnan.

References

External links
 

1984 films
1980s Malayalam-language films
Films directed by N. Sankaran Nair